Giupponia is a monotypic genus of the harvestman family Gonyleptidae. The only described species, G. chagasi, was found in two limestone caves in Serra do Ramalho, Bahia State, Brazil.

The long-legged species features several adaptations to cave life, such as complete eyelessness and lack of pigmentation.

Name
The genus and species are named after arachnologist Alessandro Ponce de Leão Giupponi and myriapodologist Amazonas Chagas Júnior, respectively.

References

Harvestmen
Monotypic arthropod genera
Arachnids of South America
Cave arachnids